Masterson of Kansas is a 1954 American Western film directed by William Castle and starring George Montgomery, Nancy Gates and James Griffith. It was produced by Sam Katzman for distribution for Columbia Pictures.

Synopsis
Bat Masterson (George Montgomery) is a gunslinger. Masterson, Wyatt Earp (Bruce Cowling) and Doc Holliday (James Griffith) come together in a common cause. The three intend to protect an impending land exchange between honest rancher Merrick (John Maxwell) and peace-seeking Indian chief Yellow Hawk (Jay Silverheels) against the crooked chicanery of land baron Clay Bennett (David Bruce).

Cast
 George Montgomery as Bat Masterson
 Nancy Gates as Amy Merrick
 James Griffith as Doc Holliday
 Jean Willes as Dallas Corey aka Mrs. Bennett
 Benny Rubin as Coroner
 William Henry as Charlie Fry
 David Bruce as Clay Bennett
 Bruce Cowling as Wyatt Earp
 Gregg Barton as Henchman Sutton
 Donald Murphy as Virgil Earp
 Gregg Martell as Mitch Connors
 Sandy Sanders as Henchman Tyler
 Jay Silverheels as Yellow Hawk
 John Maxwell as Amos Merrick

References

External links 
 
 
 
 
Review of film at Variety

1954 films
American Western (genre) films
1954 Western (genre) films
Columbia Pictures films
Films directed by William Castle
Cultural depictions of Wyatt Earp
Cultural depictions of Doc Holliday
Cultural depictions of Bat Masterson
1950s English-language films
1950s American films